The Polar Challenge was a competitive, 350 nautical mile (650 kilometer) team race taking place in the Arctic, to the 1996 location of the Magnetic North Pole. The race ran between mid-April and mid-May each year, taking teams approximately 4 weeks to complete, including the training time. This event should not be confused with the Polar Race, which was a different event taking a different route, and run by a different organisation.

Background

Competitors raced in teams of 3, many joining as individuals and forming teams when they meet other individuals during the training that led up to the race. The competitors were from different walks of life (not necessarily explorers or people with mountaineering experience), sharing a quest for adventure and to achieve something that only a few others had done.
The race took place in one of the world's most extreme and hostile environments, with temperatures dropping as low as -35 °C, and where 80% of the world’s population of polar bears live. Competitors raced on skis, pulling their supplies in 120 lb pulkas, stopping en route at 3 manned checkpoints to re-supply.

Race history
In 2003, Chris McLeod and Tony Martin captained the first and second place teams, respectively, in the first ever Polar Race. On their return to England, they decided to set up and run an alternative challenge themselves, and formed Polar Challenge Limited. Since then, they have organised and run the Polar Challenge every year.
In 2004 the race was filmed for a BBC documentary series called ‘The Challenge’ which aired on worldwide television. Paul “Seamus” Hogan, a sales manager from London, England, with no experience of the outdoors whatsoever, was asked to enter the Challenge for the program. His team, Team Fujitsu led by Chris McLeod went on to win the race.  In 2007, at the same time as the Challenge, the BBC's Top Gear programme presenters became the first people to drive to the 1996 location of the magnetic north pole in the Hilux Arctic Challenge. It was later broadcast as the Top Gear: Polar Special.

The current race record holders are Team Hardware.com, consisting of Henry Cookson, Rupert Longsdon & Rory Sweet who won the challenge in 2005, they then went on to enter the Guinness Book of Records by being the first people to reach the Southern Pole of Inaccessibility by foot & kite ski in 2007. They were guided here by veteran guide Paul Landry whom they met during training in Resolute Bay prior to the race starting.

Route
The Polar Challenge route covered 320 nautical miles. Competitors began by participating in a 4-day,  training expedition in which they set off from Resolute, Nunavut in northern Canada to Polaris Mine on Little Cornwallis Island, the Polar Challenge starting point.
The race itself was from Polaris Mine to Isachsen on Ellef Ringnes Island through 3 checkpoints. The first two checkpoints were re-supply points where competitors rested for 12–24 hours and took on new food and fuel supplies, and the third was the 1996 position of the Magnetic North Pole. The finish line was a further 25 miles beyond the third checkpoint, near a disused airstrip where planes could land.
Preliminary Stage: From Resolute to Polaris Mine area, just north of Cornwallis Island – Distance: 
Stage 1: From Polaris Mine area to a way point, just North West of Bathurst Island (Checkpoint 1 - 76°37’N 101°50’W) – Distance: 
Stage 2: Bathurst Island to a waypoint near King Christian Island (Checkpoint 2 - 77°46’N 101°45’W) – Distance: 
Stage 3: King Christian Island to 1996 Magnetic North Pole position (Checkpoint 3 - 78°35.7'N 104°11.9’W) – Distance: 
Stage 4: 1996 Magnetic North Pole position to Isachsen (Finish - 78°47’N 103°30’W) – Distance:

2004 - 2006 polar challenges
The Fujitsu Polar Challenge – in 2004, was won by Team Fujitsu.
The Scott Dunn Polar Challenge – in 2005, was won by Team Hardware.com - who set the race record of 9 days, 11 hours and 55 minutes, breaking the previous record of Team Fujitsu by 2 days.
The Sony Polar Challenge – in 2006, was won by Team ATP.

2007 Polar Challenge teams
The 2007 challenge took place in April/May 2007 and was won by team Bearing 360 North and saw the following teams compete:
Arctic Virgins: Alex Zawadzki, Laura Jones, Kirsty Bamber (Stewart)
Bearing 360 North: Christopher Mike, James Cheshire, Jonny Black
Girls on Top: Rachael Helanor, Tina Outlaw
Artemis: Mark Bates, Ian Hunter, Jean Walker
Polarity: Thom Fortunato, Gabrielle Finn, Gary Marshall
Team Spirit: Adam Komrower, Malcolm Rich
Team Star: Steve Jones, Nick Bevan, Richard Yorke
The Polar Bears: Martin Palethorpe, Miles Welch, Stuart Lotherington

In 2007 but not part of the main event; the route was filmed by a BBC Television crew for Top Gear: Polar Special, undertaking the same journey with modified Toyota Hilux pickup trucks and a dog sled.

Polar Challenge 2008 teams
The Polar Challenge 2008 took place in April/May 2008 and saw the following teams compete:

Polar Warriors/Cold Beef: Paul Moxham, Jamie Wood, Angus King
Team Gamania Foundation: Jason Chen, Kevin Lin, Albert Liu
Lost Penguins: Mike Woolliscroft, Connie Potter, Richard Wall-Morris
Best Served Chilled: Steve Napier, Barney Franklin, Giles Greenslade
The Silver Foxes: Jim Vale, Graham Walters
Polar Flame: Leslie Dang Ngoc, Thomas Carrier, Da Liang
Cold Front: Mark Priest, Mark Jurgens, Sam Long
British Sea Power: Gareth Ellis, Yoyo Schepers, Alistair Leiper,
The Holiday Club: Paul Craig, Oliver Corbett, Ross Maxwell

Polar Challenge 2010
The 2010 Polar Challenge  was won by Team Avilton (formerly Team Dark Horse) who completed the race in 9 days 14 hours and 15 minutes, missing out on the race record by just 2 hours and 20 minutes.

Race standings
Team Avilton:  Tom Williams, Rupert Nicholson, Stephanie Brimacombe
Team 1010:  Andrew Peak, Michael Sugden
Bear Babe:   Leane Franklin Smith, Chris
 Team coin: James, Mark
Team Schroder:  (Solo) James Hooley
Team Sheppard and the Cheese Rollers:  Kevin Shepard, Jo Maddocks, Claire Stringer
Global Village:  Dwayne Fields, Ali, Lynda
Team Wired:  Dell Weingarten, Debora Halbert Ellen Piangerelli

The 2010 polar challenge was the first time all competitors and teams successfully completed the entire race.

External links
Team Bearing 360 North Website
Team Dark Horse Website

Qikiqtaaluk Region
Arctic challenges
Sport in the Arctic